Boxing at the 2015 Southeast Asian Games will be held in Singapore Expo Hall 1 from 6 to 10 June 2015.

Participating nations
A total of 85 athletes from 10 nations will be competing in boxing at the 2015 Southeast Asian Games:

Competition schedule
The following is the competition schedule for the boxing competitions:

Medalists

Men

Women

Medal table

References

External links
 
 

2015
Southeast Asian Games
2015 Southeast Asian Games events